Neptis clinia, the southern sullied sailer or clear sailer, is a species of nymphalid butterfly found in South Asia and Southeast Asia.

Description

See also
List of butterflies of India
List of butterflies of India (Nymphalidae)

References

clinia
Butterflies of Asia
Butterflies of Indochina